Weilheim is the name of several towns in Germany:

Weilheim in Oberbayern, capital of the district Weilheim-Schongau
Weilheim, Baden-Württemberg, a municipality in the district of Waldshut
Weilheim an der Teck, a town in the district Esslingen
A part of Tübingen
A part of Rietheim-Weilheim
A part of Hechingen
A part of Blindheim
A part of Monheim, Bavaria